Sir John Maunsell ( 1190/1195 – 1265), Provost of Beverley Minster, was a king's clerk and a judge. He served as chancellor to King Henry III and was England's first secretary of state.

Life
His grandfather, Robert Mansel, was a Templar under Baron Gilbert de Lacy in Palestine. Robert led a small force of Welsh and Aquitanians by night to put to rout a much larger force of Turks under Sultan Nur ad-Din Zangi, at his camp outside Damascus during the reign of King Henry II. His father, Walter, a deacon, was Napkin Bearer to the King. John Maunsell is first heard of when he was sent from Scotland as orator from Alexander, King of Scotland in 1215 to the court of John.  As the son of a deacon under orders, his birth status periodically came into question eventually resulting in a letter from Pope Innocent IV ratified by Pope Alexander IV in 1259 stating "Approbation, addressed to John Mansel, Chancellor of London, the King's Clerk, of the dispensation given to him, at the King's request, by Pope Innocent, to be ordained and promoted, notwithstanding that his mother married his father, a man of noble birth, not knowing that he was a deacon, and was accounted for the time being his lawful wife; his father, after some time, repenting, resumed his orders, a divorce having been declared by their diocesan. The dispensation is approved, even if his mother's plea of ignorance and the reputation of a lawful marriage cannot be sustained."

Maunsell became a favorite of the young King Henry III and was appointed to the vacant prebend of Thame by Henry, but Robert Grosseteste, a reforming bishop with strong feelings about ecclesiastical rights and privileges, refused to admit him.  Reportedly, Maunsell took the Thame church by force before giving up his claim to the prebend (a specific type of benefice). Grosseteste, having thus vindicated his right, bestowed upon Maunsell the more lucrative benefice of Maidstone. Despite the loss of the Thame benefice, Maunsell probably obtained more benefices than any other contemporary clergyman as he amassed his plurality. Maunsell's benefices included the livings of Haughley, Howden and Bawburgh and prebends of Tottenhall, South Malling and Chichester. He was also Provost of Beverley (1247), Chancellor of St. Paul's, London, Dean of Wimborn, Rector of Wigan, Papal chaplain, and King's chaplain.

He fought with a contingent of English under Henry de Turbeville in the aid of Frederick II, King of Germany in the north of Italy in 1238. Frederick II was married to Henry's sister Isabella in 1235. He fought alongside Henry III in the Battle of Taillebourg during the Saintonge War (20–24 July 1242) and took Peter Orige, seneschal of the Count of Boulogne, prisoner. He was reckoned not least among brave men in this unsuccessful venture against Louis IX of France. He was seriously wounded while leading an assault in siege of the Verines monastery.

During 1246 and 1247 he served as Lord Chancellor of England.

John Maunsell established the Augustinian priory at Bilsington, near Romney in 1253 prudently reflecting that "the king's favour is not hereditary or worldly prosperity of lasting duration."  He is however spoken of disparagingly by the chronicling monk Matthew Paris, of St Albans Abbey, for unfairly denying legal judgment in the Abbey's favour after a monk had been attacked and robbed by his protégé Geoffrey of Childwick.

He enjoyed great secular power; the 1258 Provisions of Oxford gave four men the power to elect a council of fifteen to govern the treasury and the chancery. These four men were the Earl Marshal (the Earl of Norfolk), Hugh Bigod, John Maunsell, and the Earl of Warwick (John du Plessis). Not only did he arrange the marriage of Henry III daughter, Margaret of England to Alexander III of Scotland in 1249, but he entertained the courts of England and Scotland on King Alexander's visit to London in 1256. Such a feat would not have been possible but for the income from his pluralities. He was named Seneschal of Gascony in 1243 a post later held by Simon de Montfort, 6th Earl of Leicester and subsequently by Prince Edward. Alfonso of Castile had his eyes on Gascony and John Maunsell helped to defuse the situation by arranging the marriage of Edward to Alfonso's half-sister, Eleanor in 1254. Sedgwick castle came into his hands in 1249. In 1261 he was named Constable of the Tower of London.  He was mediator along with Simon de Montfort in arranging the marriage of Henry's daughter Beatrice with John of Brittany in 1259. John Maunsell was in France with Queen Eleanor and Edmund when Simon de Montfort vanquished Henry III at the Battle of Lewes, 14 May 1264. Shortly thereafter, Simon de Montfort took possession of Maunsell's estates in August 1264. John Maunsell died 20 January 1265 in Florence and was buried in York Minster. Among his contemporaries were the better known Simon de Montfort, 6th Earl of Leicester and Roger Bacon.

Family and issue
Burke held that Maunsell married Joan, daughter of Simon de Beauchamp of Bedford, and had the following issue:
Thomas Maunsell
William Maunsell
Henry Maunsell

However, Maunsell was in major orders, making marriage unlikely. Furthermore, he left property not to these supposed male heirs, but to his sister and niece, the rest of his estate reverting to the Crown.

Notes

References

Bibliography

Books 
 
 
 
 
 
Calendar Patent Rolls, Henry III
Papal Letters Vol i., pp. 218, 262–3, 269, 362. (Pope Innocent IV & Pope Alexander IV)
Foedera, Rymer, Vol i., pp. 48, 67, 135, 408, 415.
History of the Exchequer, Thomas Madox; Vol. ii. p. 51
Henry II and the Church, F. A. Gasquet; p. 196 et seq.
England Under the Normans and Angevins, H. W. C. Davis
Chronica Majora, Matthew Paris; Vol i. pp. 440,422.
Chronica Majora, Matthew Paris; Vol iii. p. 153.
Chronica Majora, Matthew Paris; Vol iv. pp. 294, 375, 601, 623–4.
Chronica Majora, Matthew Paris; Vol v. pp. 101, 129, 179, 223, 238–9, 268–9, 355, 450, 505, 507, 690, 719.

Royal and Other Historical Letters, Shirley, Vol i., pp. 145–6.
Royal and Other Historical Letters, Shirley, Vol ii., pp. 175, 206.
Chronicles of the Reigns of Edward I and Edward II, Vol i., pp. 60, 64, 66

External links

Electronic articles and journals
 http://www.sacred-texts.com/sro/hkt/hkt05.htm The History of the Knights Templars
 https://web.archive.org/web/20050222094527/http://home.earthlink.net/~plantagenet60/plantagenet06.htm
 http://www.biodatabase.de/Secretary%20of%20State
 http://www.british-history.ac.uk/
 https://web.archive.org/web/20050222094527/http://home.earthlink.net/~plantagenet60/plantagenet06.htm
British History Online http://www.british-history.ac.uk/
Houses of the Austin Canons http://www.british-history.ac.uk/report.asp?compid=38204

1190s births
1265 deaths
13th-century English people
Anglo-Normans
Medieval English knights
Lord chancellors of England
Seneschals of Gascony
Secretaries of State of the Kingdom of England